The Gilgit Scouts constituted a paramilitary force of the Gilgit Agency in northern Jammu and Kashmir. They were raised by the government of British India in 1913, on behalf of the princely state of Jammu and Kashmir, to police the northern frontier of India.

In November 1947, under the command of Major W. A. Brown, the Gilgit Scouts overthrew the Governor of Gilgit appointed by the Maharaja of Jammu and Kashmir, and declared accession to Pakistan. The Muslim element of the State Forces joined the rebels and executed the non-Muslim troops. Colonel Aslam Khan was given the command of the force by the Azad Kashmir provisional government. The combined force conquered Skardu (the capital of Baltistan) and threatened Ladakh, leading to the eventual formation of Gilgit-Baltistan which continues to be under Pakistani control.

The force of Gilgit Scouts was continued by Pakistan till 1975 when it was integrated into the Northern Light Infantry of the Pakistan Army.

History

Antecedents 
The Gilgit Agency was originally defended by the Imperial Service Troops provided by the Maharaja of Jammu and Kashmir and placed under the command of the Agency. A few contingents of British Indian troops and 14 British officers were added in 1891. Levies from Punial were also present earlier. After the Hunza–Nagar Campaign in 1891, and the pacification of Chilas and Chitral, the British Indian troops were gradually reduced, and replaced by new levies from Hunza, Nagar and Punial.

Formation 
In 1913, the local levies were replaced by a permanent body of troops on a company basis, under the name "Gilgit Scouts". The force was paid for by the state of Jammu and Kashmir, but commanded by British officers under the control of the British Political Agent at Gilgit. The initial strength of Gilgit Scouts was 656 men. They were organised into 8 companies of 80 men each. Each company had two native officers, a Subedar and a Jamadar.

The force had no connection to the Jammu and Kashmir State Forces, but became part of the Frontier Corps, along with Chitral Scouts, Kurram Militia and other local forces.
The recruits were from all areas of the Gilgit Agency and had the advantage of local knowledge. They were also acclimatised to local climate and the harsh mountain terrain. They were responsible for maintaining local order as well as monitoring foreign activity along the northern borders.

The recruitment in the Gilgit scouts was based on the recommendation of Mirs and Rajas of the area. Close relatives of Mirs and Rajas were given direct Viceroy commissions in Gilgit scouts.

First Kashmir War 
After the Partition of India, the Gilgit Scouts rebelled against the authority of Jammu and Kashmir and participated in the First Kashmir War. According to Major William Brown, its commanding officer, there was a secret plan among a few members of Gilgit Scouts to set up a "Republic of Gilgit-Astor(e)" when they ousted the governor of Gilgit representing the Maharaja's government on 1 November 1947. Historian Ahmad Hasan Dani mentions that although there was lack of public participation in the rebellion, pro-Pakistan sentiments were intense in the civilian population and their anti-Kashmiri sentiments were also clear. On 2 November, the Pakistani flag was raised on the old tower in the Gilgit Scout Lines, under the command of Major Brown.

On 12 January 1948, the command was handed over to Colonel Aslam Khan the first local commander of the Gilgit Scouts, under the authority of the Azad Jammu and Kashmir proviional government.

Inside Pakistan 
After the conclusion of the First Kashmir War, the Gilgit Scouts operated as a paramilitary force in the Northern Areas (now called Gilgit-Baltistan). In 1975, the force was amalgamated into the Northern Light Infantry Regiment of the Pakistan Army, where the Gilgit Scouts became the 1st and 2nd Battalions of the regiment.

Gilgit Baltistan Scouts
The force was re-raised in 2003 as the Northern Area Scouts under command of Brigadier Inayat Wali. It quickly progressed and took over the responsibilities of Law and Order in Gilgit Baltistan. January 18, 2011, The Interior Ministry renamed the Northern Areas Scouts as Gilgit Baltistan Scouts, in view of the reforms introduced in the region.

See also
Gilgit Baltistan Scouts
Gilgit Baltistan
History of Gilgit-Baltistan

References

Bibliography
 
 
 
 

Former paramilitary forces of Pakistan
History of Gilgit Agency